was a city located in Niigata Prefecture, Japan. On March 21, 2005, Toyosaka, along with the towns of Kameda, Kosudo and Yokogoshi (all from Nakakanbara District), the town of Nishikawa, and the villages of Ajikata, Iwamuro, Katahigashi, Nakanokuchi and Tsukigata (all from Nishikanbara District), was merged into the expanded city of Niigata. As of April 1, 2007, the area is part of Kita-ku ward.

The city was founded on November 1, 1970. By 2003, the city had an estimated population of 49,159 and the density of 639.67 persons per km2. The total area was 76.85 km2.

See also
 Kita-ku, Niigata
 Niigata, Niigata
 Toyosaka Station

External links
 Niigata Kita-ku website 
 Tourism Information in Kitaku, Niigata City 

Dissolved municipalities of Niigata Prefecture